Adelostigma is a genus of flowering plants in the daisy family described as a genus in 1864. It is endemic to Africa.

 Species
 Adelostigma athrixioides Steetz - Mozambique
 Adelostigma senegalensis Benth. - Senegal

References

Inuleae
Asteraceae genera
Flora of Africa